CJPG-FM is a Canadian radio station being licensed to Portage la Prairie, Manitoba, serving the Central Plains Region broadcasting at 96.5 FM with a hot adult contemporary format branded as Mix 96. This radio station also provides local news, sports and weather to its listeners. The station is currently owned by Golden West Broadcasting, and is located at 2390 Sissons Drive, along with sisterstations CFRY and CHPO-FM. While the transmitter is located west of Portage La Prairie.

External links
 Mix 96
 
 Broadcasting Decision CRTC 2003-439
 

Jpg
Jpg
Jpg
Portage la Prairie
Radio stations established in 2004
2004 establishments in Manitoba